Hedley Francis Gregory Bridges,  (April 7, 1902 – August 10, 1947) was a Canadian politician.

Born in Fredericton, New Brunswick, the son of Hedley Vicars Burpee Bridges and Mabel Eloise Fulton Gregory, he was educated at the University of New Brunswick. He studied law and was called to the Bar of New Brunswick in 1927. Bridges served as solicitor for the Royal Bank of Canada at Campbellton. He also taught school and was a high school principal.

Bridges was a member of the Legislative Assembly of New Brunswick for the electoral district of Restigouche from 1935 to 1939. From 1936 to 1938, he was the Speaker of the Legislative Assembly. During World War II, he served in the Canadian Army with the II Canadian Corps. After the war, he was elected to the House of Commons of Canada representing the riding of York—Sunbury in the 1945 federal election. A Liberal, from 1945 until his death in 1947, he was the Minister of Fisheries.

Electoral history

References
 
 Canadian Parliamentary Guide, 1939, EJ Chambers

1902 births
1947 deaths
University of New Brunswick alumni
Canadian schoolteachers
Lawyers in New Brunswick
Canadian Army personnel of World War II
Speakers of the Legislative Assembly of New Brunswick
Liberal Party of Canada MPs
Members of the House of Commons of Canada from New Brunswick
Members of the King's Privy Council for Canada
Politicians from Fredericton
New Brunswick Liberal Association MLAs
20th-century Canadian lawyers
University of New Brunswick Faculty of Law alumni